The flag of Volgograd Oblast, a federal subject of Russia, was adopted in June 2000.  The flag is a field of red (representing the courage and blood of those who fought for Russia and the oblast) with two blue vertical stripes (representing Volga and the Don rivers) at the hoist, and charged with an illustration of the statue The Motherland Calls.  The ratio of the flag is 2:3.

References

Flag of Volgograd Oblast
Flags of the federal subjects of Russia
Volgograd